Perrini may refer to:

 Californosaurus perrini, an ichthyosaur, an extinct marine reptile, lived in California
 Carabus perrini, a species of beetle in the family Carabidae
 Carabus perrini perrini, a species of beetle in the family Carabidae
 Carabus perrini planus,  a subspecies of black-coloured beetle in the family Carabidae 
 Mesoplodon perrini, the newest species of beaked whale to be described
 Phytoecia astarte perrini, a species of beetle in the family Cerambycidae

See also 
 Pierini (disambiguation)